The Newmarket and Chesterford Railway Company was an early railway company that built the first rail connection to Newmarket.

Opening
The Newmarket & Chesterford Railway was incorporated on 16 July 1846 with engineers Robert Stephenson and John Braithwaite. The act authorised capital of £350,000 on £25 shares. Backed by local owners and the Jockey Club at Newmarket the bill had a smooth passage through parliament. As well as the Newmarket to Chesterford line a branch line from Six Mile Bottom to Cambridge was also proposed. One of the stranger provisions in the act was that the railway would not be allowed to pick up or set down passengers at Cambridge station between 10 a.m. and 3 p.m. on Sundays. 

Construction began on 30 September 1846 and at the ensuing celebrations a representative of the Jockey Club stated, "The Jockey Club feels that a railway from Newmarket will not only be a great convenience to the parties anxious to participate in the truly British sport of racing, but will enable Members of Parliament to superintend a race and run back to London in time for the same night's debate".

During 1847 the company drew up plans for (separate) extensions to Bury St Edmunds, Thetford and Ely which were approved by a parliamentary act of June 1847.

The line was opened on 3 January 1848 (for goods) and 4 April (to passengers) and was commonly known as the "Newmarket Railway".

Bankruptcy
With the agreement that a line from Newmarket to Thetford could conceivably be built meant that the N&CR became an item of interest to both the Eastern Counties Railway and Norfolk Railway companies. If built it would offer a shorter route from London to Norwich so both companies were interested until 1848 when the ECR took over the working of the Norfolk Railway. The N&CR was in financial trouble with its Cambridge branch started and no capital to complete it so on 2 October 1848, the board of directors made an operational agreement with George Hudson then chairman of the Eastern Counties Railway. Unfortunately for the N&CR, Hudson was forced to resign from the ECR in early 1849 and the agreement with the N&CR was torn up. The ECR raised operational charges and the directors were unable to make a profit so, having briefly reconsidered taking back operations, they closed the railway on 30 June 1850.

Resurrection
After a shareholder meeting on 27 July the board resigned and a new board under the leadership of Cecil Fane saw the line re-opened on 30 September the same year with stock borrowed from the ECR.

It was Fane who suggested that one track of the double track line from Six Mile Bottom to Chesterford should be lifted and used to create the intended link to Cambridge which finally opened on 9 October 1851. At the same time the section of the N&CR between Six Mile Bottom and Chesterford closed. This was one of the first railway closures in British history.

The ECR finally bought out the directors of the Newmarket Railway in 1854.

Locomotives and rolling stock
The company owned six 2-4-0 locomotives all built by Gilkes & Wilson of Middlesbrough in 1848. The locomotives were named:
 Beeswing
 Queen of Trumps 
 Van Tromp
 Flying Dutchman
 Eleanor
 Alice Hawthorn
These locomotives became Eastern Counties Railway numbers 31-36 and survived into Great Eastern Railway ownership being withdrawn between 1866 and 1870.

"On opening the railway had 8 carriages and 40 horse boxes and carriage trucks."

Stations

The former Bourne Bridge station is believed to have been partly incorporated into a public house close to Pampisford station.

The Newmarket terminus was replaced several times as new lines developed, its latest site being built in 1902. The "Old Station" was used for goods until 1967 and demolished in 1980. One platform of the "New station", the North side station buildings, and the associated forecourt, still exist but the buildings and forecourt are now commercial premises.

Photographs of Balsham Road and Bourne Bridge stations exist in the Rokeby collection at the English Heritage Archive, Swindon.

Unique among stations of the line Dullingham station still exists on its original site and serves its original purpose.

References

Closed railway lines in the East of England
Pre-grouping British railway companies
Railway lines opened in 1848
Railway lines closed in 1851
Newmarket, Suffolk
Standard gauge railways in England
Rail transport in Essex
Rail transport in Suffolk